The 1984 Volvo International was a men's tennis tournament played on outdoor clay courts in North Conway, New Hampshire in the United States and was part of the 1984 Volvo Grand Prix. The tournament ran from July 30 through August 6, 1984. Eighth-seeded Joakim Nyström won the singles title.

Finals

Singles

 Joakim Nyström defeated  Tim Wilkison 6–2, 7–5
 It was Nyström's 2nd title of the year and the 4th of his career.

Doubles

 Brian Gottfried /  Tomáš Šmíd defeated  Cássio Motta /  Blaine Willenborg 6–4, 6–2
 It was Gottfried's only title of the year and the 79th of his career. It was Šmíd's 5th title of the year and the 35th of his career.

References

External links
 ITF tournament edition details

 
Volvo International
Volvo International
Volvo International
Volvo International
Volvo International